Bomaderry railway station is a heritage-listed single-platform intercity train station located in Bomaderry, New South Wales, Australia, on the South Coast railway line. Early morning and late night services to the station are provided by train replacement bus services. A siding near the station is used by freight trains operated by the Manildra Group.

The station was added to the New South Wales State Heritage Register on 2 April 1999.

History

In 1887, the southern terminus of the South Coast Line reached "North Kiama Station" (now known as ). The NSW Government Railways intended for the line to eventually connect with the Sydney network in the north, and Jervis Bay or even Eden in the south. In 1886, the firm of W. Monie & J. Angus was awarded the contract to begin the extension south. A major milestone in the work was completion of the 342-metre truss bridge over the Shoalhaven River in 1881. Bomaderry Railway Station opened on 2 June 1893 as the new – and, it was assumed, temporary – southern terminus. However, progress towards Jervis Bay stalled, and the bridge was converted for road traffic instead. But while the connection to Sydney opened in October 1888, progress towards Jervis Bay stalled.

The former Station Master's residence, along with the goods shed, timber trestle bridge over Shoalhaven Creek, and the Edwards Avenue Bomaderry timber overbridge, are among the few remaining structures from the 1893 construction period of the extension of the Illawarra Railway Line from Bombo.

Now confirmed as a permanent railhead, and with Nowra on the Shoalhaven's opposite bank expanding, Bomaderry Station's significance grew. A large goods yard was added, along with a turntable, dairy siding (1921), weighbridge (1921), railway crew barracks (1924) and crane (1934). Initially the station yard included an 1893 platform, platform building and goods shed, as well as coal and watering facilities and a  turntable that was replaced in 1914 by a  turntable. Plans dated 1928 but with later 1930s notations show a platform building, goods shed, carriage shed (north of the station masters house), coal stage and engine shed (the coal stage marked on the plans as being removed in 1936), These plans are also annotated "Trucking yards removed and land sold to the Nowra Dairy Coy 7.7.1938". The jib crane is marked on these plans as being installed in 1934 adjacent to the goods shed and the shed extended in 1944. The goods yard and goods shed were further extended in 1944 as a wartime measure. In recent years part of this has been sold, including the 1921 weighbridge and office.

In 1929, a Vacuum Oil Company siding was added and about the same time a private siding was branched off the yard towards the river to Horlickes Works and in 1956 extended to Wiggin's Teape and Nash Paper Mills Ltd's factories. Hayes and Kidd's Siding was opened in 1953.

The original platform building was destroyed in a fire in 1945 and rebuilt in the inter-war functionalist style the following year. According to the Heritage Branch, "The building is divided into three bays, each recessed behind the other to create a "stepped" effect. There are two semi-circular ended lobbies flanking the projecting parcels office on the west elevation. The circular lobby has been achieved by the use of projecting square masonry ribs (rather than callow bricks) to support a flat, concrete slab roof over the lobbies. ... one of the finest representative examples of an inter-war functionalist style railway building in the state. ... particularly noteworthy for its use of curved elements."

Bomaderry was also noteworthy as the terminus for the last section of the NSW metropolitan rail network to use the electric staff signalling system. The system, installed in 1908, was replaced with automated signalling in 2014.

Operations 

Between 1933 and 1991, Bomaderry was the terminus of a direct limited-stops service to Sydney, known as the South Coast Daylight Express. Today, most services are shuttles between Bomaderry and Kiama, the terminus of the electrified network. In 2005, then Minister for Transport John Watkins announced that electrification would be extended to Bomaderry at an unspecified future date, but the proposal did not progress.

Electronic ticketing, in the form of the Opal smart card, has been available at Bomaderry since 2014.

Track layout 
The Bomaderry yard contains four tracks: a platform road, a passing loop and two goods sidings. A security compound for overnight storage of trains is located on a small siding south of the station. A 1.8-kilometre "master siding" diverges from the number-two goods siding opposite the station, passes over Railway Street and Bolong Road, and passes Shoalhaven Steel Supplies, Shoalhaven Starches (Manildra Group) and the former dairy.

Platforms & services
Bomaderry has one platform.

Transport links
Kennedy's Tours operate three routes from Bomaderry station:
110: to Greenwell Point
111: to Orient Point
112: to Kangaroo Valley

Nowra Coaches operate three routes from Bomaderry station:
101: to Wollongong University Shoalhaven Campus
102: to Basin View
103: to Hyams Beach

Shoalbus operates three routes via Bomaderry Station:
139: to Shoalhaven Heads 
131: Bomaderry loop service 
135: to Sussex Inlet

Stuart's Coaches operate one route via Bomaderry station:
120: to Currarong via Myola

Description 
The heritage-listed station precinct includes the platform building (1946), goods shed (1893, 1944), station master's residence (1893), platform (1934, 1946), turntable (1914), jib crane (1934) and signals.

Bomaderry Station is entered from the west via the central projecting semi-circular lobby of the 1946 platform building. There is a car park (accessed from Meroo Street) immediately to the west of the platform building. There is a single perimeter platform on the eastern side of the 1946 platform building, and at the southern end of the platform is the horse dock and signals.

The station perimeter is defined by white powder coated aluminium fencing.

There are a set of points on the platform in an aluminium fenced enclosure at the southern end of the platform beneath a flat corrugated steel roofed shelter carried on 4 steel posts.

The yard stretches to the north, south and east of the platform building and platform. The goods shed, with jib crane at its northern end, is located to the southeast of the platform and visible from it. The weighbridge (no longer in RailCorp ownership) is on the eastern side of the railway lines. The turntable is at the far southern end of the railway yard and not visible from the platform.

The Station Master's residence is on the west side of the railway lines, north of the Bomaderry station car park. The residence faces the Railway Station car park to the south of the property, not Meroo Street, which is to the west boundary of the property. The site is fenced with cyclone wire fencing.

Tree plantings south of the station car park, north of the platform building and in the residence garden.

A planting bed with the name of the station "Bomaderry" spelt out in closely planted and tightly clipped bedding plants is in the corridor opposite the platform, The garden bed is edged with railway sleepers laid flat reinforced by a length of old rail to act as a vehicle wheel bumper.

Platform Building (1946)

A single storey brick Inter war Functionalist style building, with 2 slightly projecting decorative soldier courses (above and below window height) and a complex glazed hipped terra cotta tiled roof form. The building is divided into three bays, each recessed behind the other to create a "stepped" effect. There are two semi-circular ended lobbies flanking the projecting parcels office on the west elevation. The circular lobby has been achieved by the use of projecting square masonry ribs (rather than callow bricks) to support a flat, concrete slab roof over the lobbies.

Most windows are original steel framed awning windows, generally placed in groups of 3 or 4 vertically. There are some timber double doors and some timber flush doors with sidelights. Fenestration is symmetrical. The walls feature brick vents. There are curved brick edges to doorways.

The waiting room exit features a pair of curved brick pilasters supporting a curved cement rendered hood. Toilets at the northern end of the platform building have an additional soldier course of brickwork beneath the windows, steel framed awning windows in groups of 3, and some steel framed window openings each with 3 large frosted glass louvres. The building has wide fibro clad eaves.

An external curved corned awning carried on round painted steel posts faces the car park. The car park (west) elevation of the main platform building has projecting soldier courses in places.

Most of the original interior fitout has been removed although some original elements remain, particularly in the lobby and parcels office foyer. The interior consists of a series of discrete spaces arranged on a linear pattern with direct access from the platform. From east to west these spaces comprise: men's toilet, ladies toilet, ladies waiting room, general waiting room, booking office, Station Master's room, parcels office, store, staff room and out-of-room. The projecting semi-circular bay contains a public lobby and is the main entrance to the station and platform.

The waiting room interior has modern floor tiles, a colourful modern mural to 3 walls, and a modern fibre-cement ceiling. The entry area to the station from the car park has modern tiling, modern mosaic decoration, and fixed steel framed windows in groups of 4 (vertically), and also the interior wall facing west has been decorated with hand painted tiles above doorway level. The hand painted tiles to the entry lobby and the mural to the waiting room appear to have been part of a recent community art project.

Station Master's Residence (1893)

The Station Master's residence is a freestanding weatherboard single storey house with a gabled corrugated steel roof, skillion roofed rear sections, and a hipped corrugated steel roofed front veranda. East and west gable ends feature timber barge boards and timber louvred vents. Windows are timber framed double hung, and the front windows (facing into the enclosed front veranda) have vertical glazing bars to sashes. Some windows have timber fretwork window hoods. The house is supported on brick piers. There is a later rear skillion roofed laundry addition at the north-western corner of the residence. The front veranda has been enclosed with horizontal weatherboards and fixed and louvred timber framed windows, with a door at the western end. There is a section of brickwork towards the rear on the western elevation which is the base of a former kitchen chimney.

The interior of the residence appeared relatively intact, with timber wall linings and timber ceilings to main rooms accessed (bedrooms not accessed). Vinyl and carpet floor coverings.

Goods Shed (1893, 1944)

This is a single storey rectangular corrugated steel shed (walls and roof) with a gabled roof, elevated on a timber platform. The goods shed and crane are isolated between railway lines to the southeast of the station platform. The goods shed has brick piers and a timber floor which extends out to the west beyond the building. To the north of the building is a concrete deck on a steel framed base level with the floor of the goods shed. To the north of the goods shed, over the southern end of the concrete deck, is a gable roofed shelter carried on 4 timber posts, the gable roof being an extension of the corrugated steel gabled roof of the goods shed. The north end of the deck platform has a flat corrugated steel roofed shelter carried on 4 steel posts. There are concrete steps with a pipe railing at the north-western end of the concrete deck/platform. The goods shed features two pairs of timber tongue and grooved double doors with diagonal boarding, which face west.

Fibro Garage ( 1940s)
A freestanding single storey fibro asbestos garage at the rear, to the northeast of the residence, which has a corrugated steel gabled roof.

Jib Crane (1934)
The jib crane is located just north of and adjacent to the good shed deck/platform, and is mounted on a round concrete base almost level with the height of the platform. The crane is pinned in to prevent movement. The crane is marked "T133" and "Safe Load 8 tons Class 1".

Turntable (1914)
The turntable is located at the far southern end of the Bomaderry Railway Station yard complex. It is a sunken circular brick edged structure with a single rail on timber sleepers running around the inside, and a cast iron turntable machine in the centre marked "William Sellers & Co. Philadelphia No. 1327". The brick edging of the turntable has a soldier course capping, but is otherwise in stretcher bond. There is also an old hold-down point not far to the north of the turntable structure.

Platform (1934, 1946)
A long perimeter platform extending north–south on the eastern side of the Platform building. The Bomaderry Platform base is brick with a concrete base, with an asphalt surface. At the south-western end there is a loading dock and access built in 1934 for British Australian Milk Pty Ltd. A set of points is located nearby.

Signals (1946)
There are a set of signal points on the platform in an aluminium fenced enclosure at the southern end of the platform beneath a flat corrugated steel roofed shelter carried on 4 steel posts.

Two other structures associated with the station precinct are located nearby but are privately owned:

Weighbridge (1921)
Located on the eastern side of the railway tracks, opposite the southern end of the platform, within a cyclone wire fenced enclosure, the weighbridge is a small single storey weatherboard building with a gabled corrugated steel roof. The building has timber double hung windows, and a timber tongue & grooved door on its southern side. The building has plain timber bargeboards to the north and south gable ends. Although the building is privately owned and outside the curtilage, its proximity to and relationship with Bomaderry Station makes it necessary to consider it an important part of the site's history.

Former Nowra Dairy Co-Op Building (1938)
Located a short distance from the station (at the northern end of the platform) is a building associated with the former Nowra Dairy Co-Op siding. This building is also an excellent example of Inter-War period architecture and is particularly noteworthy for its bowed steel roof. Although the building is privately owned and outside the curtilage, its proximity to and relationship with Bomaderry Station makes it necessary to consider it an important part of the site's history.

Condition 

As at 22 February 2011, the platform building, platform, horse dock and points and signals were reported to be in good condition, while the former station master's residence, turntable, jib crane and fibro garage were in moderate condition and the goods shed in poor condition due to the timber floor being extensively deteriorated.

The Bomaderry Railway Station platform building is considered to have retained a high degree of external integrity. The interior fitout has been altered in 1994. The railway station yard has been altered over time, however retains extant structures covering the period from 1893 (goods shed) to 1946 (platform and platform building), despite some loss of structures from the yard relating to steam technology (carriage shed, engine shed, coal staging and watering structures have been removed from the yard). The Station Master's residence is intact.

Modifications and dates 
 1934: timber stage and access erected at south end of platform for British Australian Milk Pty Ltd
 1936: Coal stage removed
 1938: Trucking yards removed, and the land sold to the Nowra Dairy Cooperative. Platform extended south.
  1940s: addition of fibro asbestos garage behind the residence.
 1944: 1893 Goods shed extended.
 1946: The current platform and platform building replaced the 1893 platform and platform building destroyed by fire in 1945.
 1994: Internal refurbishment of Platform building, new roof tiling to match existing, and new roof membranes to flat roofed sections of platform building.
 date unknown: engine shed and carriage shed shown on 1928 plans removed.
 date unknown: Alterations to the Station Master's residence- front veranda enclosed with weatherboards and timber framed fixed and louvred windows; rear skillion roofed laundry addition in hardiplank at the north-western corner of the residence, with aluminium framed windows; demolition of chimneys (there were originally 2 chimneys to the ridge of the gabled roof and a kitchen chimney at the rear - the brick base of the kitchen chimney remains). The original typical design for this type of Station Master's residence would also have included a timber picket front fence and a timber valence to the front veranda, neither now extant. 1928 plans for the station precinct show garden areas to the south of the residence, within what is now the station car park, and these are no longer extant.

Heritage listing 

The Bomaderry Railway Station and Yard group is of State historical significance as a significant collection of railway structures and machinery dating from 1893 to 1946 at an important terminus location with a significant history as a goods yard, and for its relationship with the development of Bomaderry and Nowra since 1893, including its role in the development of local industry.
The Bomaderry Railway Station 1946 platform building is of State aesthetic significance as one of the finest representative examples of an Inter-War Functionalist style Railway building in the state. It is particularly noteworthy for its use of curved elements, such as the projecting bay and awning. The Bomaderry turntable is rare (one of 3 turntables now extant on the Illawarra line - Bomaderry, Waterfall and Kiama).

The Bomaderry Station Master's residence (1893) is of State historical significance as evidence of late 19th century railway operational requirements to accommodate railway staff on site at railway stations, as one of the few remaining structures at the Bomaderry railway terminus dating from 1893, and as a now rare design of station master's residence, the design of which has historical association with the office of Henry Deane, Engineer-in-Chief of Railways Construction 1891–1901. Bomaderry station master's residence is of aesthetic significance as a simple vernacular weatherboard Victorian Georgian style house, purpose-built for the accommodation of railway staff.

Bomaderry railway station was listed on the New South Wales State Heritage Register on 2 April 1999 having satisfied the following criteria.

The place is important in demonstrating the course, or pattern, of cultural or natural history in New South Wales.

The Bomaderry Railway Station and Yard Group is of State historical significance as a significant collection of railway structures and machinery dating from 1893 to 1946 at an important terminus location with a significant history as a goods yard, and for its relationship with the development of Bomaderry and Nowra since 1893, including its role in the development of local industry.

The individual components of the site - the 1893 goods shed (extended in 1944), 1914 turntable, 1934 jib crane, and 1946 platform and platform building, horse dock, points and signals - illustrate aspects of the evolution of the station and yard since 1893, from steam to diesel train technology (despite the loss of the carriage shed, engine shed and coal stage and watering from the yard). Nearby related structures - the 1914 weighbridge and 1938 Nowra Dairy Co-op building - also add to the manner in which the site's history is evoked by extant structures.

Bomaderry Station Master's residence (1893) is of State historical significance as part of the overall Bomaderry Station Group as evidence of late 19th century railway operational requirements to accommodate railway staff on site at railway stations, as one of the few remaining structures at the Bomaderry railway terminus dating from the original period of construction of the Bomaderry Railway Station, and as an early example of a standard Station Master's residence design which formed a model for the later standard designs for such residences issued in 1899 by the office of Henry Deane, Engineer-in-Chief for Railways Construction, 1891–1901.

The place has a strong or special association with a person, or group of persons, of importance of cultural or natural history of New South Wales's history.

The design of the Bomaderry Station Master's residence has historical association with the office of Henry Deane, Engineer-in-Chief of Railways Construction for NSW Railways 1891–1901.

The place is important in demonstrating aesthetic characteristics and/or a high degree of creative or technical achievement in New South Wales.

The Bomaderry Railway Station 1946 platform building is of State aesthetic significance as one of the finest representative examples of an Inter-War Functionalist style Railway building in the state. It is particularly noteworthy for its use of curved elements, such as the projecting bay and awning.

Bomaderry Station Master's residence is of aesthetic significance as a simple vernacular weatherboard Victorian Georgian style house, purpose-built for the accommodation of railway staff.

The place has strong or special association with a particular community or cultural group in New South Wales for social, cultural or spiritual reasons.

The place has the potential to contribute to the local community's sense of place, and can provide a connection to the local community's past.

The place possesses uncommon, rare or endangered aspects of the cultural or natural history of New South Wales.

The Bomaderry turntable is rare (one of only 4 turntables now extant on the Illawarra line - Bomaderry, Wollongong, Waterfall and Kiama).

The Bomaderry goods shed is rare as only one of a few goods sheds that remain in the Metropolitan area, once a common structure at all major station sites (other similar example at Berry).

Bomaderry Station Master's residence is rare as one of the few remaining structures at the Bomaderry railway terminus dating from the original period of construction of the Bomaderry Railway Station in 1893 (the only other structures at Bomaderry form this period are the goods shed and timber trestle bridge). The Bomaderry Station Master's residence is one of five examples of its type of design of railway residence remaining in Government ownership in the Metropolitan network (the others being at Berry, Shellharbour, Morisset and Teralba).

The place is important in demonstrating the principal characteristics of a class of cultural or natural places/environments in New South Wales.

The Bomaderry Railway Station platform building is one of the finest representative examples of an Inter-War Functionalist style railway platform building in NSW.

The Bomaderry Station Master's residence is a representative early example a railway residence which predates the standard designs of 1899. Over 76 residences of this design were constructed by NSW Railways throughout the state, however many have since been demolished or sold for private use.

References

Bibliography

Attribution

External links

Bomaderry details Transport for New South Wales

Easy Access railway stations in New South Wales
Railway stations in Australia opened in 1893
Regional railway stations in New South Wales
New South Wales State Heritage Register
City of Shoalhaven